The Brush Canyon Line was a short-lived Pacific Electric streetcar branch line in Los Angeles.

Route
The line branched from the Western & Franklin Ave. Line at Franklin & Bronson Avenue to travel north on Bronson to a rock quarry. Roughly an additional mile of track extended into the quarry site.

History
The line was built by the Los Angeles Pacific Railroad in 1908 as a single-track narrow gauge branch — it was converted to standard gauge later the same year. Pacific Electric took over the service in 1911 and operated the line as a shuttle. Service was abandoned on August 6, 1918.

While passenger service was provided, this branch line was primarily used for freight to carry rocks used to pave Sunset Boulevard, Highland Avenue, Adams Boulevard, West 6th Street, and Wilshire Boulevard in addition to track ballast for most Western District lines.

See also
Streetcar suburb
History of rail transportation in California

References

External links
Electric Railway Heritage Association

History of Los Angeles
Light rail in California
Pacific Electric routes
Railway lines opened in 1908
1908 establishments in California
1918 disestablishments in California
Railway lines closed in 1918
Closed railway lines in the United States